King's Leadership Academy Liverpool (formerly Shorefields School and then University Academy Liverpool) is a coeducational secondary school and sixth form located in the Dingle area of Liverpool, England.

Previously a foundation school administered by Liverpool City Council, Shorefields School converted to academy status in 2012 and was renamed University Academy Liverpool. The school was sponsored by the University of Chester Academies Trust, In 2015, due to ongoing concerns regarding UCATs sponsorship, low exam grade outcomes, and interim leadership and management, the Department for Education changed the sponsor of University Academy Liverpool to King's Leadership Academy in Warrington (now the Great Schools Trust) who appointed a new principal and leadership team. The school was then renamed King's Leadership Academy Liverpool.

King's Leadership Academy Liverpool offers GCSEs and BTECs as programmes of study for pupils, while students in the sixth form have the option to study from a range of A-levels, NVQs, City and Guilds qualifications and further BTECs.

References

External links
King's Leadership Academy Liverpool official website

Secondary schools in Liverpool
Academies in Liverpool